The PMI Colleges Bohol is a private, non-sectarian, co-educational institution of higher learning in Tagbilaran City, Bohol, Philippines and is  part of the PMI Colleges system. It offers marine courses such as Marine Transportation, Marine Engineering and Customs Administration. With its main building at Carlos P. Garcia Avenue, it has an extension campus at Tomas Cloma Avenue, Barangay Taloto, Tagbilaran City.

History
The first PMI Colleges (formerly known as  Philippine Maritime Institute) campus was established on September 18, 1948 in Santa Cruz, Manila by Atty. Tomas Cloma (an Admiral and founder of the Kalayaan Group of Islands). In addition to his lasting and well-established academic legacy in PMI Colleges, Admiral Cloma also established several academic ventures in his home province of Bohol. He contributed in the establishment of the Loboc Academy and the Mount Carmel’s School, which he donated to the Balilihan Parish. He opened the College for Far East in Tagbilaran City before finally putting up PMI Colleges-Bohol, the third campus in the Philippines of PMI Colleges after Manila and Quezon City.

All the schools that he put up in his home province of Bohol is Admiral Cloma’s way of providing opportunities and hope for ambitious and determined young people in Bohol, and more importantly, in looking back to his roots because he knew that if he was able to succeed in life armed only with hard work, determination and perseverance, then anybody else can.

See also
 PMI Colleges
 Atty. Tomas Cloma

Universities and colleges in Bohol
Education in Tagbilaran